Krider's hawk or Krider's red-tailed hawk (Buteo jamaicensis kriderii) is a subspecies or color morph of red-tailed hawk. Authorities vary in their treatment of the taxon. It was named after John Krider, the gunsmith from Philadelphia who collected the type specimen, which is preserved in the collection of the Academy of Natural Sciences of Drexel University.

In the breeding season, it occurs from southern Alberta, southern Saskatchewan, southern Manitoba, and extreme western Ontario south to south-central Montana, Wyoming, western Nebraska, and western Minnesota. In winter, it occurs from South Dakota and southern Minnesota south to Arizona, New Mexico, Texas and Louisiana.

It is about the same size as the western red-tailed hawk (B. j. calurus).

Hybridization is possible and known to occur, most extensively with B. j. calurus, but also in the Dakotas and eastern Wyoming with the eastern red-tailed hawk (B. j. borealis) and in Alberta some possible Krider's hybrids with Harlan's hawks (B. j. harlani) have been reported (despite being considerably farther east than Harlan's tend to breed). Krider's hawk is paler than other red tails, with the head typically white (and the crown invariably so) with somewhat darker nape, variable dark markings about the face (sometimes either through the eyes, forming a moustache or ear streaks). The upperparts are light brown and upper-wing coverts are heavily mottled white, the tail is typically whitish at the base otherwise a fairly pale pink rufous (more rufous than the somewhat similar marked ferruginous hawk, which also have rufous "trousers" that are pure white on Krider's). Krider's hawks are distinctly all white underneath with no trace of a belly band, unlike the palest B. m. harlani. There is much individual variation, which is complicated by possible racial hybridization. One study found males more likely than females to have pure B. j. kriderii characteristics. The same study found that Krider's hawks were fully specialized as breeders for the prairie habitat, favoring much more open areas than do other red tails or especially Harlan's hawks. While wintering Harlan's and Krider's hawks frequently occur in the same general areas, but their habitat preferences there were highly different, Harlan's favoring thickly timbered areas and Krider's in quite grassy open areas. Wintering Krider's also used different and more open habitats than resident red tails. These authors questioned whether Krider's hawk was once a pure subspecies, similar to the prairie merlin, but following human habitat alterations, B. j. calurus and B. j. borealis encroached into their breeding ranges and diluted their characteristics.

References 

Krider's hawk